Haw Creek may refer to:

Haw Creek (Morgan County, Missouri), a stream in Missouri
Haw Creek (Salt River), a stream in Missouri
Haw Creek (Haw River tributary), a stream in Alamance County, North Carolina
Haw Creek Township (disambiguation)